Discovery Channel is a French pay television channel that was launched on 1 September 2004. Until then, France had been the only region in Western Europe not reached by the Discovery Channel. It initially reached 3.2 million subscribers via the CanalSat platform. On 31 March 2009, the channel adopted the new Discovery Channel logo and look.

The channel faces competition from other documentary channels such as Planète+ and National Geographic.

In December 2016, Altice acquired an exclusivity agreement with NBCUniversal and Discovery Networks. Discovery Channel and Science were removed from Canal on 17 January 2017, and French versions of Investigation Discovery and Discovery Family were launched exclusively on SFR.

Programming
Programs are mostly taken from the United Kingdom and the United States and include:
 American Chopper
 Biker Build-Off (Duels de bikers)
 Building the Future (Construire l'avenir)
 Eyewitness (Temoin sur le vif)
 How Do They Do It? (Comment ça marche ?)
 Long Way Round (L'echappee belle)
 Megastructures (Mega constructions)
 MythBusters (Myth busters)
 Really Big Things (Monstres Mecaniques)
 Smash Lab (Crash Lab)
 Time Warp
 Top Gear

References

External links

France
Television stations in France
Television channels and stations established in 2004
2004 establishments in France
Warner Bros. Discovery EMEA